Lynk & Co 06 is a subcompact crossover SUV manufactured by Chinese-Swedish automaker Lynk & Co that slots below Lynk & Co 01. It was based on the same platform as the Geely Binyue subcompact crossover, and went on sale on 7 September 2020.

History

The Lynk & Co 06 crossover was marketed as a subcompact crossover and was positioned below the Lynk & Co 02. The Lynk & Co 06 offers two powertrain choices including a petrol engine and a plug-in hybrid system. A  plug-in hybrid version of the Lynk & Co 06 combining the 1.5-litre turbocharged three-cylinder engine with a  electric motor and a battery pack will follow.

References 

06
Cars introduced in 2020
2020s cars
Mini sport utility vehicles
Crossover sport utility vehicles
Front-wheel-drive vehicles
Cars of China